Gößweinstein is a municipality in the district of Forchheim in Bavaria in Germany. It lies within the region known as Franconian Switzerland.

Districts

History
The first record of Goswinesteyn Castle is from 1076. Prior to 1102 the Hochstift Bamberg became the owner of the castle. The prince-bishop of Bamberg Friedrich Carl von Schönborn (ruled from 1729 until 1746) elevated Gößweinstein's status to a Market. During the Secularization in 1803, the area of the Hochstift Bamberg was transferred to Bavaria. During the Bavarian territorial reforms in 1978, the formerly independent communities of Morschreuth, Wichsenstein, Behringersmühle, Kleingesee, Leutzdorf, Stadelhofen, Unterailsfeld and part of the community Tüchersfeld were integrated into Gößweinstein.

Culture and sights

Museums
 Franconian Toy Museum Gößweinstein
 Natural history and geological Collection in the Haus des Gastes
 Steam locomotive train (Dampfbahn Fränkische Schweiz)

Buildings

 Pilgrimage church of the Holy Trinity, 1730–1739 built during the reign of Fürstbischof Friedrich Carl von Schönborn according to plans by Balthasar Neumann, who also supervised the construction. Franciscan padre Prof. Dr. Luchesius Spätling applied for the denomination as Basilica minor. The church was elevated to the papal Basilica minor in 1948 by Pope Pius XII.
 Gößweinstein Castle
 Viktor-von-Scheffel-memorial On both sides, there are the lines of the poem "Ausfahrt" (Exit):
Ich fahr’ in die Welt!
Mein Hutschmuck die Rose, mein Lager im Moose,
Der Himmel mein Zelt.
Mag lauern und trauern, wer will, hinter Mauern –
Ich fahr’ in die Welt!

Lookout points
 Gernerfels
 Kreuzberg with high cross
 Martinswand (Bellevue)
 Pavillon Wagnershöhe
 Ludwigshöhe (Theaterhöhle)
 Bärenstein (529 m NN)
 Fischersruh
 Nuremberg Chapel
 Aussichtsfelsen Wichsenstein (585 m NN)

Politics

The municipal council in Gößweinstein has 16 members plus an extraofficial mayor.

(local elections on March 3, 2002)

References

External links

 Official homepage (German)
 Franconian Toy Museum

 
Forchheim (district)
Franconian Switzerland